The Kingston courthouse shooting was a fatal shooting that took place on August 9, 2005, at the Roane County Courthouse in Kingston, Tennessee, United States. It resulted in the death of a Tennessee Department of Correction transport officer, and the wounding of another officer. The perpetrator, Jennifer Forsyth Hyatte (born February 11, 1974), began shooting immediately after her husband, George, pleaded guilty to a robbery charge in the courthouse. 

Jennifer Hyatte is currently serving a life sentence without the possibility of parole. George Hyatte pleaded guilty to first-degree murder in the shooting in 2009 and was sentenced to life in prison as part of a plea bargain to avoid the death penalty.

The shooting
At approximately 10:00 a.m., after a court hearing, Tennessee Department of Corrections transport officer Wayne "Cotton" Morgan was fatally shot three times by Jennifer Forsyth Hyatte, whose husband, George Hyatte, pleaded guilty to a charge of robbery. Officer Morgan and his partner were loading prisoners into a transport van after a court appearance, when Jennifer Forsythe Hyatte drove up and opened fire with a handgun, striking Officer Morgan three times in the abdomen. Officer Morgan's partner returned fire as the escaping prisoner climbed inside his wife's vehicle. Jennifer Forsythe Hyatte was a former nurse at a prison where George Hyatte had been an inmate. She had been fired after she was found sneaking food to George. The woman and her inmate husband, who had served two years of a 35 year sentence for aggravated robbery and aggravated assault, fled the scene in the vehicle but switched cars a short distance away. On August 10, the Chevrolet Venture used was found in the parking lot of an Econo Lodge in Erlanger, Kentucky, but neither Hyatte was found. The same night the Hyattes were charged with first-degree murder.

Capture
On August 10, 2005, around 10:00 p.m., the Hyattes were captured at an America's Best Value Inn located in Columbus, Ohio. The couple was captured after a cab driver named Mike Wagers drove them from Erlanger, Kentucky, to a Best Value Inn.

Court proceedings
On September 17, 2007, Jennifer Hyatte pleaded guilty to first-degree murder and was sentenced to life imprisonment without the possibility of parole. According to the Tennessee Department of Corrections website, her TOMIS (Tennessee Offender Management Information System) number is 00394869, her imprisonment began on 10 August 2005 and she is incarcerated at the Tennessee Prison for Women in Nashville.

As a condition of the plea bargain which allowed her to avoid the death penalty, she agreed to testify against George Hyatte. However her testimony was not required because subsequently, George Hyatte did not contest the charges made against him. On March 9, 2009, he pleaded guilty to all charges, including the first-degree murder of Officer Wayne "Cotton" Morgan. As a result, George Hyatte was sentenced to life imprisonment without the possibility of parole.

References

External links 
 CNN.com . "Courthouse Shooting Leaves Officer Dead." CNN transcript, draft [?]. Tony Harris, host. http://transcripts.cnn.com/TRANSCRIPTS/0508/09/lol.01.html, 9 Aug 2005. Accessed 30 May 2006.
 Dill, Amanda, Producer. "National memorial adds Tennessee officers killed in line of duty," AP, WBIR.com, http://www.wbir.com/news/archive.aspx?storyid=34291, 13 May 2006, 11:56:27 PM. Accessed 30 May 2006.
 Silence, Michael, "Breaking News: Courthouse Shooting," Knox News [online version of Knoxville News Sentinel] http://blogs.knoxnews.com/knx/silence/archives/2005/08/breaking_news_c.shtml, 9 Aug 2005, 11:35 AM. Accessed 30 May 2006.
 State of Tennessee, Department of Corrections. News Release. "Inmate Escapes From Roane County Courthouse, Correctional Officer Fatally Wounded," http://www.tennessee.gov/correction/newsreleases/2005news/hyatteescapes.html 9 Aug 2005. Accessed 30 May 2006.
 Fox News Capture Story
 CNN Capture Story

 MSNBC Coverage

Roane County, Tennessee
Murder in Tennessee
2005 murders in the United States
2005 in Tennessee
Crimes in Tennessee
Deaths by firearm in Tennessee
Attacks in the United States in 2005